Limestone Township is the name of some places in the U.S. state of Pennsylvania:

Limestone Township, Clarion County, Pennsylvania
Limestone Township, Lycoming County, Pennsylvania
Limestone Township, Montour County, Pennsylvania
Limestone Township, Union County, Pennsylvania
Limestone Township, Warren County, Pennsylvania

Pennsylvania township disambiguation pages